The Voice Nigeria Season 1 is the first season of the Nigerian version of the TV series The Voice. It was broadcast on Africa Magic from 10 April 2016 to 31 July 2016 and was sponsored by Airtel and Coca-Cola.The winner earned a recording contract with Universal Music Group, an SUV car worth N7 million and a trip to Abu Dhabi.

Coaches and Hosts

Teams
Color key

Battles
Color key

References

Nigeria
2016 television seasons

See also
The Voice Nigeria
The Voice Nigeria (Season 2)